State of Affairs was an American television espionage thriller series created by Alexi Hawley, which premiered on NBC on November 17, 2014, during the 2014–15 American television season. The series stars Katherine Heigl as CIA analyst Charleston Tucker, who is tasked with assembling and presenting the President's Daily Briefing on the most vital security issues facing the country, and Alfre Woodard as the first black woman to be elected President of the United States, Constance Payton. After one season, NBC cancelled State of Affairs.

Cast and characters

Main
Katherine Heigl as Charleston "Charlie" Whitney Tucker, a CIA analyst, responsible for the President's Daily Briefing.
Alfre Woodard as Constance Payton, President of the United States.
Adam Kaufman as Lucas Newsome, CIA Analyst and Briefer for the CIA Director.
Sheila Vand as Maureen James, CIA Analyst and Briefer for the Secretary of Defense and Charlie's best friend.
Cliff Chamberlain as Kurt Tannen, CIA Analyst and Briefer for the State Department.
Tommy Savas as Dashiell Greer, CIA Analyst and Briefer to FBI, various agencies within the United States Intelligence Community.
David Harbour as David Patrick, White House Chief of Staff.

Recurring
Derek Ray as Jack Dawkins, CIA paramilitary officer, JSOC operator and former Navy SEAL.
James Remar as Syd Vaslo, former CIA case officer who runs a private sector "clandestine service".
Farshad Farahat as Omar Abdul Fatah, terrorist responsible for the attack on the diplomatic motorcade that resulted in a gun battle that killed the President's son in Kabul. 
Mark Tallman as Aaron Payton, deceased son of the President and fiancé of Charlie.
Chris McKenna as Nick Vera, CIA case officer and a retired Marine Raider Regiment Operator.
Nestor Carbonell as Raymond Navarro, Director of the CIA.
Courtney B. Vance as Marshall Payton, pro bono counsel for advocacy groups and First Gentleman of The United States.
Christopher Michael Holley as Earl Givens, CIA analyst, Operations Center Senior Duty Officer.
Melinda McGraw as Senator Kyle Green, President Payton’s rival.
Jenny Pellicer as Emily/Melissa Anchez, mysterious woman of many identities who works with Syd.
Nick Shakoour as Aleek Al Moosari, jihadist who works for Fatah.
Anil Kumar as Professor Ahmad Ahmadi.
Cress Williams as Dale Scott, FBI agent.
Adam Arkin as Victor Gantry, businessman and former CIA case officer.
Rex Linn as Senator Burke, Senate Majority Leader.
Matthew Lillard as DD Banks, deputy CIA director.

Episodes

Development
NBC acquired the rights of the series in September 2013. In January 2014, the network announced the project had received a pilot order. The pilot was ordered to series in May 2014. In August 2014, Ed Bernero left his position as showrunner before the show's premiere because of "creative differences" with fellow executive producer Joe Carnahan.

Reception

Critical reception
State of Affairs received negative reviews from critics, although Alfre Woodard's performance garnered praise. On Metacritic the show has a score of 43 out of 100, based on 28 critics, indicating "mixed or average reviews". On Rotten Tomatoes the show holds a rating of 26%, based on 42 reviews, with an average rating of 5.2/10. The critical consensus reads: "State of Affairs benefits from Alfre Woodard's talent, but this overly serious show is dragged down by Katherine Heigl's unsympathetic character and a surfeit of unintentional laughs."

Amy Amatangelo of Boston Herald  gave the premiere a grade of "C", stating that "Alfre Woodard isn’t given a lot to do as President Constance Payton in the premiere, but, unlike Heigl, she does have the gravitas for the role, and the show would be wise to use her more. The series sets up some interesting revelations in the hour’s final moments. They potentially could make the show more interesting. But for now the state of affairs is rather mediocre."

Ratings

Awards and nominations

Broadcast
In Canada, State of Affairs airs on Global at the same time as the original broadcast. In the Middle East, each episode of State of Affairs aired on OSN one week after the original broadcast. In Australia, the series was picked up by Seven Network, and debuted on 19 February 2015. In New Zealand it will air on TV3 in 2015. In India, it aired on Colors Infinity in 2015. In Germany, it was aired on NBCUniversal International Networks’s Universal Channel and its debut premiere on September 16, 2015.

By the 2014-15 year, State of Affairs was also picked up by 13th Street in France, Czech Republic, and Denmark.

References

External links
 
 

2010s American drama television series
2014 American television series debuts
2015 American television series endings
English-language television shows
Espionage television series
NBC original programming
Television series by Universal Television
Television shows set in Washington, D.C.